Rehab medicine may refer to:
 Physical Medicine and Rehabilitation, a field of medicine dealing with management of acute and chronic disorders by means of physical modalities as well as rehabilitation 
 Drug rehabilitation, dealing with management of drug addiction and dependence